Contrada is a town and comune in the province of Avellino, Campania, southern Italy.

Culture

Notable people 

Antonio Ammaturo, police officer, Vicequestore (assistant chief), head of Squadra Mobile of the Police Headquarters in Naples, responsible for a vivid contrast to the activities of criminal organizations in the territory of Southern Italy, especially against Camorra in the Neapolitan area, killed by a terrorist commando of BR in unclear circumstances, in Piazza Nicola Amore in Naples, 15 July 1982. Ammaturo was famous for his strong opposition to the famous criminal boss Raffaele Cutolo.

References

Cities and towns in Campania